Anetta Kalinowski (born 20 January 1963) is a German sports shooter. She competed in the women's 25 metre pistol event at the 1988 Summer Olympics.

References

1963 births
Living people
German female sport shooters
Olympic shooters of West Germany
Shooters at the 1988 Summer Olympics
Sportspeople from Łódź